Dhankar Lake is a high altitude lake in Spiti Valley, in the Himachal Pradesh state of India.

References

External links
Himachal Pradesh Tourism Department

Lakes of Himachal Pradesh
Geography of Lahaul and Spiti district